D. E. Johnson  (born Dan E. Johnson) is an American author of mystery novels He attended Central Michigan University.

The Detroit Electric Scheme: A Mystery 

The Detroit Electric Scheme: A Mystery was published by St. Martin's Minotaur Books in September 2010.

From the Amazon book description:

"Will Anderson is a drunk, heartbroken over the breakup with his fiancée, Elizabeth. He’s barely kept his job at his father’s company---Detroit Electric, 1910’s leading electric automobile manufacturer. Late one night, Elizabeth’s new fiancé and Will’s one-time friend, John Cooper, asks Will to meet him at the car factory. He finds Cooper dead, crushed in a huge hydraulic roof press. Surprised by the police, Will panics and runs, leaving behind his cap and automobile, and buries his blood-spattered clothing in a garbage can.

What follows is a fast-paced, detail-filled ride through early-1900s Detroit, involving murder, blackmail, organized crime, the development of a wonderful friendship, and the inside story on early electric automobiles. Through it all, Will learns that clearing himself of the crime he was framed for is only the beginning. To survive, and for his loved ones to survive, he must also become a man.

The Detroit Electric Scheme is populated with fascinating characters, both real and fictional, from a then-flourishing Detroit: The Dodge brothers and Edsel Ford come to life, interacting with denizens of the sordid underbelly of the Motor City, such as Vito Adamo, Detroit’s first Mob boss, and Big Boy, the bouncer at a saloon so notorious the newspapers called it “The Bucket of Blood.” This expertly plotted debut delivers with great research, wonderfully flawed yet likable characters, and a shattering climax."

The novel is the first in a series of books featuring Will Anderson. Later books in the series include Motor City shakedown,  Detroit breakdown, and Detroit shuffle.

References

External links 
 D.E. Johnson author site

Year of birth missing (living people)
Living people
Place of birth missing (living people)
American male writers